Kichik-Alay is a village in Osh Region of Kyrgyzstan. It is part of the Nookat District. Its population was 266 in 2021.

References

External links 
 Satellite map at Maplandia.com

Populated places in Osh Region